Simone Berthe Ballard (26 March 1895 – 8 October 1978) was a French operatic mezzo-soprano and contralto who sang leading parts, including premieres, at La Monnaie in Brussels.

Career 
Simone Ballard was born in Sannois, Paris. Both her parents were engaged at the Paris Opera, her father Louis Ballard as a bass from 1894 to 1897, while her mother, Berthe Bronville (born 6 March 1865 in Paris), made her debut as a soprano in the role of Alice in Meyerbeer's Robert le diable but gave up her career when she married in 1891.

Ballard received early piano education and studied voice at the Conservatoire national de Paris with Eugène Lorrain and Jacques Isnardon. She made her debut at the Opera at La Monnaie in 1921 as Amneris in Verdi's Aida. The performance won her an engagement at the house, where she sang until 1940. She took part in premieres, appearing on 2 May 1926 as the sister-in-law in Milhaud's Les malheurs d'Orphée; on 28 December 1927 in the title role of Honegger's Antigone; and in 1929 in Sergei Prokofiev's Le Joueur.

She appeared in the first stagings of several operas at La Monnaie, including Kseniya's nurse in Modest Mussorgsky's Boris Godunov (1921), Khivria in Mussorgsky's The Fair at Sorochyntsi (1925), Tkatchikha in Nikolai Rimsky-Korsakov's The Tale of Tsar Saltan (1926), The Mother / The Dragonfly, and the Chinese Cup in Maurice Ravel's L'enfant et les sortilèges (1926), Dèbora in Ildebrando Pizzetti's Dèbora e Jaéle (1929), and Orsola in Zandonai's La farsa amorosa (1933). Her about 70 parts included Azucena in Verdi's Il trovatore, Dalila in Samson et Dalila by Saint-Saëns, and the title role in Massenet's Hérodiade. She performed roles in stage works by Richard Wagner, such as Magdalene in Die Meistersinger von Nürnberg, Brangäne in Tristan und Isolde and Fricka in Der Ring des Nibelungen. She also appeared as the Countess in Tchaikovsky's Pique Dame, as Annina in Der Rosenkavalier by Strauss, as the grandmother in Manuel de Falla's La vida breve, and as Juno in Offenbach's Orphée aux enfers

Ballard retired from the stage when she married the composer and conductor Albert Wolff in 1940. She die in Six-Fours-les-Plages in the south of France.

References 

1895 births
1978 deaths
Conservatoire de Paris alumni
French operatic mezzo-sopranos
Operatic contraltos
20th-century French women opera singers